War in My Mind is the ninth solo studio album by American singer-songwriter Beth Hart, released on September 27, 2019. The album was produced by Rob Cavallo. Hart will tour the UK and Ireland in support of the album in 2020.

Background
In the album announcement, Hart commented: "More than any record I've ever made, I'm more open to being myself on these songs [...] On this record, something told me, 'Just let it be what it is.' I think I'm starting to make a little headway, getting closer to the truth. And I might not know what the truth is... but I'm OK with that."

Critical reception

Writing for American Songwriter, Hal Horowitz called it "arguably [Hart's] most intimate and intense set yet", further commenting that "Her dynamic, classically influenced piano propels most songs including the ballads, such as the title track, that dominate this set. [...] There's no denying the truth, integrity and gritty realism that infuses everything Beth Hart touches."

Track listing

Charts

References

2019 albums
Albums produced by Rob Cavallo
Beth Hart albums
Mascot Label Group albums